Air Costa was an Indian regional airline headquartered in Vijayawada and based out of Chennai International Airport. It was owned by Indian business company LEPL Group. The airline commenced operations as a regional airline in October 2013 using two Embraer E-170 aircraft, with the first flight taking off from Chennai on 16 October 2013. The airline received a permit for pan-India operations in October 2016. The airline focused on connectivity between tier II and tier III cities in the country, and invested  as of 2015. Air Costa operated 32 daily flights to nine destinations from its focus cities Chennai and Vijayawada as of 2015. The airline had a maintenance center in Chennai. On 28 February 2017, it suspended operations until further notice.

History
Air Costa was owned by Indian business company LEPL Group. The airline received a No-Objection Certificate (NOC) from the Ministry of Civil Aviation in February 2012. The airline initially planned to start operations with a fleet of Q400 aircraft but later announced its decision to acquire Embraer Jets at the Paris Air Show in June 2013. Air Costa received its Air Operators' Permit (AOP) from the Directorate General of Civil Aviation (DGCA) in September 2013.

The airline commenced operations as a regional airline in October 2013 using two Embraer E-170 aircraft with the first flight taking off from its hub at Chennai on 16 October 2013. The airline focused on connectivity between tier II and tier III cities in the country and has invested  as of 2015.

Air Costa ordered 50 Embraer E-Jets E2 aircraft worth  during the Singapore Airshow on 13 February 2014. Embraer has cancelled the order. The airline would have become the Asian launch customer for the type if it would have taken the first delivery in 2018 as planned.

In September 2015, Air Costa, which held a regional airline's license, applied to the aviation regulator DGCA for its license to be upgraded to that of a national airline. Air Costa received a no-objection certificate from the civil aviation ministry for pan-India operations on 19 December 2015. Two Embraer E-190s were added by September 2015. Air Costa added one more E-190 in December 2015 and had plans to add three to five E-190 aircraft in its fleet in 2016. The airline had a 0.8% market share in the Indian domestic airline market as of February 2016.

On 28 February 2017, Air Costa suspended operations until further notice stating financial difficulties regarding the lease of aircraft. GECAS seized two of the airline's leased aircraft, while a third had already been returned to the lessor.

Destinations

Air Costa was flying to the following destinations in India at the time it suspended operations:

Fleet

Prior to suspending operations in February 2017, the Air Costa fleet consisted of the following aircraft:

References

External links

Official website

Defunct airlines of India
Airlines established in 2013
Airlines disestablished in 2017
Defunct low-cost airlines
Indian companies disestablished in 2017
Indian companies established in 2013
2013 establishments in Andhra Pradesh
Companies based in Vijayawada